The 2013 Manta Open is a professional tennis tournament played on clay courts. It was the 10th edition of the tournament which was part of the 2013 ATP Challenger Tour. It took place in Manta, Ecuador between 1 and 7 July 2013.

Singles main draw entrants

Seeds

 1 Rankings are as of June 25, 2013.

Other entrants
The following players received wildcards into the singles main draw:

  Emilio Gómez
  Diego Hidalgo
  Nicolás Massú
  Roberto Quiroz

The following players received entry as alternates into the singles main draw:
  Iván Endara
  Juan Ignacio Londero
  Michael Quintero

The following players received entry from the qualifying draw:
  Andres Cabezas
  Sergio Galdós
  Felipe Mantilla
  Eduardo Struvay

Champions

Singles

 Michael Russell def.  Greg Jones 4–6, 6–0, 7–5

Doubles

 Marcelo Arévalo /  Sergio Galdós def.  Alejandro González /  Carlos Salamanca 6–3, 6–4

External links
Official Website

Manta Open
Manta Open